The European Journalism Centre (EJC) is an independent, non-profit institute, based in Maastricht, Limburg, The Netherlands.

Operations
Its aim is to give further training to mid-career journalists and media professionals. The institute also acts a partner and organiser at the European level for media companies, professional organisations, journalism schools and government bodies seeking to establish activities and projects.

For an extensive research project on food worldwide, Dutch newspaper de Volkskrant was given the European Publishers' Long-term Reporting Grant. The EJC was financed for this grant by the Bill & Melinda Gates Foundation.

They run the DataDrivenJournalism.net project which is acknowledged as a leading source of information about data driven journalism, and coordinated the Data Journalism Handbook, along with The Open Knowledge Foundation.

Its director, since 2016 is Adam Thomas.

In 2017, European Journalism Centre launched 'The News Impact' programme, an attempt to assemble hands-on professionals who may be able to tutor future journalists, on the grounds of innovation, tools of journalism as well as technology. This program, which usually consists of multiple annual events is powered by Google News Initiative.

Former director, 2006–2016, was Wilfried Ruetten, also board member of the Global Editors Network since April 2011. He was previously the head of digital television at the University of Applied Sciences in Salzburg, Austria, and has worked in German public and private broadcasting as a reporter and producer (ARD, RTL Group...) as well as in journalism education.

References

External links 

 , the centre's official website
European Centre for Digital Communication 
Crossroads, web magazine for expatriates in Maastricht, published by the European Journalism Centre 
Eufeeds, aggregator of newspaper RSS feeds from all EU member states 
Eu4journalists, background details and essential information about the European Union 
DataDrivenJournalism.net – Leading website about data journalism

Year of establishment missing
Journalism organizations in Europe
Maastricht
Organisations based in Limburg (Netherlands)